Salt marsh may refer to:
 Salt marsh, a marsh regularly inundated by salty ocean tides 
 Salt Marsh Opera, an opera company named for salt marshes Connecticut and Rhode Island
 Inland salt marsh, a saltwater marsh located away from any ocean coast
 Saltmarsh (surname), an English surname
 Salt Marsh, the original name of the abandoned Seapo, Kansas